The Heidelberg‒Wiesloch Electric Railway is a metre gauge railway and tram line running along the Bergstraße route form Heidelberg southwards towards Wiesloch, Germany.   the northern section of the route carries as Line 23 of the Heidelberg Tramway system, terminating at Leimen Cemetery.  The southern section, which carried tram Line 8 between Leimen and Wiesloch Schillerpark closed in 1973.

Development
The  (BBB) company was founded in Frankfurt am Main on 18 January 1898.

On 7 May 1898 a request was made to the Lord Mayor of Wiesloch for assistance in obtaining permission to build the line.  Permission was obtained on 6 June 1900, with the voltage limited to 530 volts.

Further reading

References

 , Leimen Friedhof tram stop, southern terminus of the line

Metre gauge railways in Germany